Lurate Caccivio is a comune (municipality) in the Province of Como in the Italian region Lombardy, located about  northwest of Milan and about  southwest of Como.

Lurate Caccivio borders the following municipalities: Appiano Gentile, Beregazzo con Figliaro, Bulgarograsso, Colverde, Olgiate Comasco, Oltrona di San Mamette, Villa Guardia.

Twin towns — sister cities
Lurate Caccivio is twinned with:

  Cerchiara di Calabria, Italy
  Fusine, Italy

References

External links
 Official website

Cities and towns in Lombardy